Goin' Off is the debut studio album by American hip hop musician Biz Markie. The album was released by Cold Chillin' Records, and produced by Marley Marl. Big Daddy Kane wrote the lyrics of the album's first five songs. The album also showcased Biz's talent as a human beatbox on the song "Make the Music with Your Mouth, Biz", and his skill in the game of dozens on the track "Nobody Beats the Biz". One of his most widely known songs, "Vapors", was on the album.

Some reissues from 1995 onwards replace the Marley Marl remix of "Make the Music with Your Mouth" with the original 12" version, the album version of "Vapors" with the remix, and the original "This Is Something for the Radio" with the remix. In 2006, the album was re-released by Traffic Entertainment Group with a bonus disc. It restores the original album versions of "Vapors" and "This Is Something for the Radio" as well as the Marley Marl remix of "Make the Music" that appeared on the original LP.

Critical reception 
Reviewing for The Village Voice in July 1988, Robert Christgau highlighted "This Is Something for the Radio" and "Pickin' Boogers", which he called "timeless", but suggested the other singles had less "life".

In 1998, the album was selected as one of The Source's 100 Best Rap Albums.

The album is broken down track-by-track by Biz Markie in Brian Coleman's book Check the Technique.

Track listing 
 All tracks produced by Marley Marl.

Personnel

Singles

Charts

References 

1987 debut albums
Biz Markie albums
Albums produced by Marley Marl
Cold Chillin' Records albums